The 2000–01 Real Sporting de Gijón season was the third consecutive season of the club in Segunda División after its last relegation from La Liga.

Overview
On 14 January 2001, just after beating Atlético de Madrid by 1–0, Vicente Cantatore resigned as manager. Pepe Acebal, in that time coach of the reserve team, replaced him until the end of the season.

Squad

From the youth squad

Competitions

Segunda División

Results by round

League table

Matches

Copa del Rey

Matches

Squad statistics

Appearances and goals

|}

References

External links
Profile at BDFutbol
Official website

Sporting de Gijón seasons
Sporting de Gijon